Fritchey is a surname. Notable people with the surname include:

Clayton Fritchey (1904–2001), American journalist 
John Fritchey (born 1964), American politician
John Augustus Fritchey (1857–1916), American physician and politician